The 2015–16 Abilene Christian Wildcats men's basketball team represented Abilene Christian University during the 2015–16 NCAA Division I men's basketball season. The Wildcats were led by fifth year head coach Joe Golding and played their home games at the Moody Coliseum. They were members of the Southland Conference. The Wildcats finished the season with a record of 13–18, 8–10 in Southland play to finish in seventh place.

Abilene Christian, in their third year of Division II to Division I transition, were not eligible for the Southland tournament, but were considered a Division I team for scheduling purposes and Division I RPI member.

Preseason
The Wildcats were picked to finish thirteenth (13th) in both the Southland Conference Coaches' Poll and the conference Sports Information Director's Poll.

Roster

Schedule and results
Source

|-
!colspan=9 style="" | Non-Conference regular season

|-
|-
!colspan=9 style="" | Southland regular season

See also
2015–16 Abilene Christian Wildcats women's basketball team

References

Abilene Christian Wildcats men's basketball seasons
Abilene Christian
Abilene Christian Wildcats basketball
Abilene Christian Wildcats basketball